refers to the phenomenon of acquiring reading materials but letting them pile up in one's home without reading them. It is also used to refer to books ready for reading later when they are on a bookshelf.

The term originated in the Meiji era (1868–1912) as Japanese slang. There are suggestions to use the word in the English language and include it in dictionaries like the Collins Dictionary.
 
The American author and bibliophile A. Edward Newton commented on a similar state in 1921.

See also

Bibliophilia
Bibliomania

References

Book collecting
Book terminology
Concepts in aesthetics
Japanese aesthetics
Japanese words and phrases
Words and phrases with no direct English translation